Amphipoea interoceanica, the interoceanic ear moth, strawberry cutworm moth or strawberry cutworm, is a moth of the family Noctuidae first described by Smith in 1899. It is found from coast to coast in the United States. In Canada from Quebec west to Alberta (but not the coastal provinces), Nova Scotia.

The wingspan is 28–35 mm. Adults are on wing from July to August depending on the location.

The larvae feed on the leaves, stems and fruit stalks of Fragaria species, grasses and sedges.

External links

Acronictinae
Moths of North America
Moths described in 1899